The 2008–09 Texas A&M Aggies women's basketball team represented Texas A&M University in NCAA Division I women's college basketball.

Preseason outlook
The team placed 10th and 11th in the preseason Coaches Poll and AP Poll, respectively. The Big 12 coaches picked the squad to finish 5th in the conference, behind first-place favorite Oklahoma, followed by Texas, Iowa State, and Baylor. Athlon Sports ranked the Aggies 4th in their preseason poll, while Lindy's poll placed them 11th. A Sports Illustrated writer also ranked the team 11th in her power rankings.

Recruiting
During the early signing period in November 2008, the Aggies signed Diamond Ashmore, Adrienne Pratcher, Kristi Bellock, and Cierra Windham. As of 20 November 2008, ESPN Hoopgurlz ranks the recruiting class 7th nationally.

Players

Preseason honors
The Big 12 coaches selected Tanisha Smith as the Preseason Newcomer of the Year, and Tyra White as the Preseason co-Freshman of the Year. Takia Starks also made the preseason all-Big 12 team, and Danielle Gant received honorable mention.

Sporting News included Starks in its preseason All-American first team. Starks became the first player in school history to be named a preseason first-team All-American. She also made the 25-member Wade Trophy preseason watch list and was one of the 30 John R. Wooden Award candidates.

In October 2008, Gant received the Academic Momentum Award, presented by The Scholar-Baller Program, a partner of National Consortium for Academics and Sports. The award is given to student-athletes who have "demonstrated significant academic improvement throughout their collegiate careers".

Season accolades
Tyra White received the Big 12 Freshman of the Week honor for the week of 14–16 November. Adaora Elonu received the same honor for the week of 17–23 November, and Sydney Carter got the co-honor for the week of 24–30 November. Elonu picked up her second honor for the week of 1 December–7, and got another co-honor for the week of 15–21 December. Takia Starks received her first honor for the week of 22 December – 4 January. Danielle Gant got her first for the week of 5–11 January. After posting 11 points in a career-high 31 minutes of play against Oklahoma, and a game-high and career-high of 17 points at Kansas State, Sydney Carter grabbed the weekly honor for the week of 23 February – 1 March.

Upon defeating New Mexico 83–51, the Aggies set a school record for the largest margin of victory in a home game over a ranked opponent. The previous record was 19, which was compiled in the 2007–08 home matchup against Baylor.

Two players—Damitria Buchanan and Katrina Limbaha—made the 2008–09 Academic All-Big 12 women's basketball team. Both made the first team as they had a GPA greater than 3.20.

Starks became the all-time leading scorer of A&M after posting 19 points in the first round of the NCAA tournament.

Schedule

|-
!colspan=9| Exhibition

|-
!colspan=9| Regular season

|-
!colspan=9| Big 12 Tournament

|-
!colspan=9| NCAA Tournament

References

External links
Official website

Texas A&M Aggies women's basketball seasons
Texas AandM
Texas AandM